Visa vad du går för is a 2000 studio album by Swedish dansband Grönwalls. The album is the first with the band's new lead singer, Camilla Lindén.

Track listing
Visa vad du går för (T. Pettersson)
Alla ord på vägen (C. Kindbom – T. Thörnholm)
Jag ger dig min dag (H.Sethsson)
Varje gång jag drömmer (L. Holm – G. Lengstrand)
Rör vid mig (C. Kindbom – T. Thörnholm)
Vertical Expression (D. Bellamy)
So Long Bye Bye (B. Nilsson)
Två namn i en ring (S. Hoge – P. Barnhart – J.House-H. Krohn)
He-man (C. Wedin)
Min allra bästa vän (H. Krohn)
When Love Starts Talkin' (J. OHara – B. Warfer – G. Nicholson)
Tillbaks igen (K.Fingal – H.Krohn)
Maniana (A. Anderson – L. White – C. Cannon – K. Almgren)
Den allra bästa tiden (A. Överland – C. Lösnitz)

References 

2000 albums
Grönwalls albums